Henrik Have (14 March 1946 – 12 September 2014) was a Danish visual artist and author. His parents were a laborer, farm owner. Helmer Andreas Have and laborer Carla Christine Bloch. In 1989, he married Anne Katrine Kokholm Nielsen.

He died on 12 September 2014 at the age of 68 following an illness.

He received a Danish Arts Foundation grant for life in 1990, and the Eckersberg Medal and Leo Estvads Grant in 1998.

He was married to Anne Katrine Kokholm Nielsen and worked from a studio in a West Jutland farmhouse.

References

1946 births
2014 deaths
Danish painters
Recipients of the Eckersberg Medal